Nazir or Nazeer is both a given name and a surname. Occurrences of the name include:

Given name:
 Nazeer Abbasi (died 1989), Sindhi political activist
 Nazeer Akbarabadi, 18th-century Urdu poet
 Nazeer Allie (born 1985), South African footballer
 Nazeer Naji, Pakistani journalist
 Nazir Ahmed (disambiguation)
 Nazir Afzal, (born 1962), British solicitor
 Nazir Jairazbhoy (1927–2009), professor of music at UCLA
 Nazir Sabir, Pakistani mountaineer
 Nazir Dekhaiya (1921-1988), Gujarati poet from India

Surname:
 Imran Nazir (born 1981), Pakistani cricketer
 Maulvi Nazir (1975–2013), Pakistani Taliban leader
 Prem Nazir (1926–1989), Malayali Indian film actor
 Shaied Nazir (born 1980), convicted of the racially motivated murder of Ross Parker